Nachit is a village in West Azerbaijan Province, Iran.

Nachit may also refer to:
 Nachit-e Kuranlu, East Azerbaijan Province
 Nachit Kuranlu, East Azerbaijan Province